The Mirrors of My Soul is an album by the Palestinian artist Rim Banna, released in 2005. Rim Banna, who gained global recognition as part of the Lullabies from the Axis of Evil project returns with a Norwegian band with a decidedly folk-pop recording of Palestinian songs. Produced in cooperation with a Norwegean quintet, it features "Western pop styling" fused with Middle Eastern modal and vocal structures, and Arabic lyrics. Though the style of this album differs from previous recordings, the subject matter has basically remained constant. The album includes "songs of despair and hope" about the lives of "a struggling people, and even a song about late Palestinian leader and PA president Arafat in a way that is both thoughtful and subtle".

Track listing
 "The Mirrors Of My Soul" - 6:19 (مرايا الروح)
 "The Carmel Of My Soul" - 4:37 (كرمال الروح)
 "Malek" - 4:08 (مالك)
 "Ya Jammal" - 4:36 (ياجمال)
 "Masha'al" - 4:51 (مشعل)
 "Sarah" - 5:10 (سارة)
 "The Moon Glowed" - 4:01 (لاح القمر)
 "The Top Of The Mountain" - 5:24 (راس الجبل)
 "Fares Odeh" - 5:57 (فارس عودة)
 "The Grandma With A Limp" - 3:53 (ستّي العرجة)
 "The Voice, The Fragrance And The Figure" - 6:11 (الصوت والرائحة والشكل)

Musicians
 Rim Banna, vocals
 Elvind Aarset, guitar
 David Wallumrød, piano and keyboards
 Gjermund Silset, bass guitar
 Rune Arnesen, drums

References

2005 albums
Rim Banna albums